Beni Osmanoski (born 18 April 1988), also known as Beni the Dog, is a professional kickboxer  4 x Swiss Champion, 4 x European Champion and 6 x  World Champions title ISKA and World Kickboxing and Karate Union WKU in K1rules and Thaiboxing.

Titles
Austria Open W.A.K.O Kickboxing with lowkick Vice World Champion 2008
Swiss Champion Muay Thai -86kg  09
Swiss Champion Class A  (S.C.O.S) Swiss Combat System  2010
Winner of 4 man Tournament middleweight winner by two K.Os
Swiss Champion PRO K1Rules W.F.C 2011 winner by K.O 2nd Round Middleweight opponent Ylli RashitiKosovo
Defending PRO K1Rules W.F.C Title 2012 winner by K.O 1st round opponent Ylli Rashiti Kosovo
European Champion W.F.C 2012 Thaiboxing middleweight winner by K.O 1st round opponent Romain Falendry France
European Champion K1rules 2014 I.S.K.A Middleweight Winner by decision of the judges opponent Denis Vuicic Srbija
European Champion K1rules 2015 W.P.K.C winner by K.O in 1st round opponent Vittorio Lermano Italy
European Champion K1rules 2014 W.F.M.C winner by K.O 2nd round opponent Dimitry Mekhanikov Russia 
World Champion I.S.K.A K1rules  2016 winner by K.O 2nd Round, opponent Abdel Moulay France
World Champion K1rules W.K.U 2015 Middleweight Winner  by T.K.O 4th round, opponent Martin Kalucz Hungary
Defending World Champion title  W.K.U 2016  winner by decision by the judges, opponent Ömer Kocak Turkey
Defending World Champion title W.K.U 2017 winner by K.O 2nd round, opponent Almedin Hasanagic Bosnia and  Herzegovina
Defending World Champion title W.K.U 2017 Winner by Majority decision, opponent Damian Darker  Ireland
World Karate and Kickboxing Association World Champion  winner by Majority decision (09/04/2022)

References

External links 
 

1988 births
Living people
Macedonian male kickboxers
Swiss male kickboxers